South Dakota is a state in the United States.

South Dakota may also refer to:
 University of South Dakota, a public coeducational research (R2) university in Vermillion
South Dakota Coyotes athletic teams representing the University of South Dakota
 South Dakota State University, a public research university in Brookings
South Dakota State Jackrabbits athletic teams representing South Dakota State University
 , the name of three ships of the U.S. Navy
 , a class of six ships authorized but never completed
 , a class of four ships which saw service in World War II
 26715 South Dakota, an asteroid

See also 
 
 Dakota (disambiguation)